Parens melli is a moth of the family Erebidae first described by Michael Fibiger in 2011. It is found in China (it was described from Fusan).

The wingspan is about 10 mm. The forewings are beige with a dark terminal area and fringes. There are six black costal dots. The crosslines are light brown and indistinct, except the terminal line, which is marked with black interveinal dots. The fringes are black. The hindwings are grey throughout with an indistinct discal spot. The underside of the forewing is unicolorous brown with three light yellow subapical spots on the costa. The underside of the hindwings is light grey with and indistinct discal spot.

References

Micronoctuini
Moths described in 2011